Garodia International Centre for Learning Mumbai  also known as Garodia International School, is an educational institution based in Ghatkopar, Mumbai, India. GICLM owns various educational subsidiary including P. G. Garodia School, P. G. Garodia Conservatiore - The Music School, One World International School - Singapore and Garodia School of Professional Studies. The School has been awarded International Centre status by the University of Cambridge International Examinations and is affiliated to the International Baccalaureate Organization.

History
In the year 1969, Parmeshwari Devi Gordhandas Garodia started a school in a garage in Ghatkopar, Mumbai comprising just 7 students and one teacher. With 3200 students today, the same school stands tall in Garodia Nagar, in the name of P. G. Garodia School (ICSE). Various pioneering initiatives spearheaded by the Garodia Education are as follows:-

P. G. Garodia School
P. G. Garodia English High School was established way back in 1969 by Late Smt. Parmeshwaridevi Gordhandas Garodia. The school started off with seven students in a makeshift room.

P. G. Garodia Conservatiore - The Music School
Students are trained in western music.

Garodia School of Professional Studies
Garodia School of Professional Studies (GSPS) was established in 1992 as a specialized academic institution for the Smt P.G. Garodia Charitable Trust, to impart professional education/ training in various fields. The institute has received government recognition in the year 2004 and now also conducts the Three Year Part Time Government Diploma in Interior Designing and Decoration, affiliated to the Maharashtra State Board of Technical Education.

Affiliation
University of Cambridge International Examinations awarded GICLM International Centre status. The school is affiliated to the International Baccalaureate Organization. GICLM is also authorized to teach and examine a range of internationally accepted qualifications including IGCSE, AS & A Levels, IBDP.

Faculty
Specialist teachers are also employed to teach Music, Art, Speech & Drama, Physical Education, and Languages. T

References

Educational institutions established in 1969
High schools and secondary schools in Mumbai
Cambridge schools in India
International Baccalaureate schools in India
1969 establishments in Maharashtra